Marmot Mountain is a  mountain summit located in Alberta, Canada.

Description
Marmot Mountain is set within Jasper National Park, in the Trident Range of the Canadian Rockies. The nearest higher neighbor is Terminal Mountain,  to the southwest. Precipitation runoff from Marmot Mountain drains into Portal Creek and Whistlers Creek which are both tributaries of the Athabasca River. Topographic relief is modest as the summit rises 1,550 meters (5,085 feet) above the Athabasca Valley in six kilometers (3.7 miles). The mountain was named in 1916 and the toponym was officially adopted February 7, 1951, by the Geographical Names Board of Canada. The name refers to the marmot, which are large ground squirrels which inhabit the slopes. The Whistlers, Siffleur Mountain and Arctomys Peak also owe their names to the marmot, an indication that the animal was a favorite of the early explorers in Alberta.

Climate

Based on the Köppen climate classification, Marmot Mountain is located in a subarctic climate zone with cold, snowy winters, and mild summers. Winter temperatures can drop below -20 °C with wind chill factors below -30 °C. This climate supports the Marmot Basin ski area on the eastern slopes.

Geology

The mountain is composed of sedimentary rock laid down during the Precambrian to Jurassic periods and pushed east and over the top of younger rock during the Laramide orogeny.

See also
 
 Geography of Alberta

Gallery

References

External links
 Parks Canada web site: Jasper National Park
 Marmot Mountain: weather forecast

Two-thousanders of Alberta
Mountains of Jasper National Park
Canadian Rockies
Alberta's Rockies